BRICK1 is a putative micropeptide protein that in humans is encoded by the C3orf10 gene.

References

Further reading

External links
 
 PDBe-KB provides an overview of all the structure information available in the PDB for Human Protein BRICK1